Rasteau is a commune in the Vaucluse department in the Provence-Alpes-Côte d'Azur region in southeastern France.

Town twins 
  Houyet, Belgium (since 1991)

See also
Communes of the Vaucluse department
Rasteau AOC, a wine appellation covering Rasteau and some neighbouring communes

References

Communes of Vaucluse